Scilla mischtschenkoana, the Mishchenko or Misczenko squill, early squill or white squill, is a perennial plant  that is native to the South Caucasus and northern Iran.

Each plant grows from a small bulb, with 2-3 strap shaped leaves and pale blue flowers with darker veins, blooming in early spring or late winter.

S. mischtschenkoana and the cultivar 'Tubergeniana' have gained the Royal Horticultural Society's Award of Garden Merit.

References

External links

Ornamental Plants from Russia and Adjacent States of the Former Soviet Union
IPNI Listing
Kew Plant List

mischtschenkoana
Ephemeral plants